The Carpathian Flysch Belt is an arcuate tectonic zone included in the megastructural elevation of the Carpathians on the external periphery of the mountain chain. Geomorphologically it is a portion of the Outer Carpathians. Geologically it is a thin-skinned thrust belt or accretionary wedge, formed by rootless nappes consisting of so-called flysch – alternating marine deposits of claystones, shales and sandstones which were detached from their substratum and moved tens of kilometers to the north (generally). The Flysch Belt is together with Neogene volcanic complexes the only extant tectonic zone along the whole Carpathian arc.

Areal extent 
The Carpathian Flysch Belt is connected to the flysch belt of the Alps (Rhenodanubian Flysch) and continues through the territory of the Czech Republic, Slovakia, Poland, Ukraine and Romania. The belt is about 1,300 km long and 60 – 75 km wide. Sequences of the Flysch belt are thrusted over the margin of Carpathian foredeep in the north. The foreland of the Flysch belt is built by Bohemian Massif in the west, East-European Platform in the north and Moesian Platform in the east. In the south it is bounded by the Pieniny Klippen Belt in its western segment. The southern boundary of the Flysch Belt in the area of the Romanian Carpathians is covered by nappes of the crystalline-Mesozoic zone.

Geological structure 
The zone is primarily composed of sedimentary rocks which were deposited from the Upper Jurassic up to the Cretaceous-Paleogene periods. The Flysch Belt is structural remnant of several basins, developed in front of the advancing ancestral Carpathians and later incorporated in the Tertiary Carpathian fold and thrust belt. The former sedimentary basin of the Carpathian Flysch belt was a portion of the Alpine Tethys Ocean. The present rocks are not in their former position because they were detached from their basement during the closure and subduction of basins and pushed as nappe pile, forming the Carpathian accretionary wedge. The fold axial planes have generally north vergence, north-western in the western sector, northern in the central sector and north-eastern to eastern in the eastern sector. Only the nappes of the South Carpathians have eastern to south-eastern vergence.

Approximately at the line of the Hodonín – Námestovo – Nowy Sacz – Neresnica distinct zone of negative gravimetric anomaly that follows the southern edge of the Bohemian Massif and East-European Platform, which are underthrust below the Carpathians. Anomalous crustal thickening, significant especially in southeastern Poland and western Ukraine, is probably caused by slab break off. The Earth's crust in this area reaches up to 65 km depth.

From the neotectonic point of view, the whole area of the Flysch belt is affected by extension, locally up to 12 mm per year.

Regional division 
Outer Carpathian tectonic units included in the Flysch Belt are divided according to their structural position in the frame of mountain range. Tectonic units vary not only in their structural position but also in differences in sedimentary sequences and other anomalies. Various tectonic divisions of the Flysch Belt were introduced. Generally these principal zones can be recognized:
Magura nappes (Lower Cretaceous to Eocene) in Northern Carpathians
Krosno-Silesia nappes (Lower Jurassic to Lower Miocene) in Northern Carpathians
Moldavide nappes (Lower Cretaceous to Lower Miocene) in Romanian Carpathians

Evolution 

Sedimentation in the basins of the Flysch Belt is recorded since the Upper Jurassic period up to Oligocene resp. beginning of Miocene. Basins of the Flysch zone were formed in the Middle Jurassic — Lower Cretaceous period of post-rift subsidence. During the Upper Cretaceous—Palaeocene time inversion locally occurred. In the most areas subsidence continued through the Palaeocene to Middle Eocene. Synorogenic closing of the basins followed in Upper Eocene–Lower Miocene. Nappes are mostly composed of turbidites – alternating sandstones and claystones.

In the past it was believed that the source area of the clastic sediments supplied to the basins was built by a system of linear island elevations which were parallel to the axis of the mountain chain. Although such conceptions still remain, recent interpretations assume that material was supplied by submarine canyons from the adjacent shelf areas (e.g. Nesvačilka canyon).

The nappes of the Flysch Belt were thrusted due to subduction of their basement and later formed and fold and thrust belt. The character of the lithosphere in former Flysch basins (oceanic, suboceanic or continental) is a matter of debate. Deformation of the belt was gradual. The area of the Magura Basin was deformed in the Upper Oligocene to Badenian (Middle Miocene). The Silezian and Ždánice units were deformed in the Karpatian to Lower Badenian. The Moldavide Flysch was deformed since the Burdigalian, especially in Sarmatian and Badenian. Internal nappes show older Upper Cretaceous deformation. Subduction of the Flysch Belt basement was generally south verging; internal units were therefore thrust over the external ones from the south to north (in the Western sector) or West to East (in Eastern sector). The tertiary shortening of the Flysch Belt is approximately 130–135 km. Closure of the basins was connected with the motion of the Inner Carpathian crustal blocks so-called lateral extrusion to the East and Northeast and intensive Calc-alkaline volcanism in the Carpathian internal zones. Extrusion together with the movement into the “Carpathian embayment” was coeval with prominent rotation of Western Carpathian units in a counter-clockwise direction (up to 90°) and clockwise rotation of Eastern Carpathian units. Loading of the Flysch zone nappes forced subsidence in its foreland, causing formation of the Carpathian foredeep. Also, coeval back-arc extension occurred in the Pannonian region forming a half graben system Pannonian Basin.

References 

Geology of the Carpathians
Geology of Europe
Geology of Poland
Geology of Slovakia
Geology of the Czech Republic
Geology of Romania